Victor Gustave Quinson (21 January 1868 – 1 August 1943) was a French playwright and theatre director.

Born in Marseille, Quinson successively or even simultaneously directed, among others, the Theatre moderne, the Gymnase, the Vaudeville, the Bouffes-Parisiens and especially the Théâtre du Palais-Royal from 1910 to 1942. He is also the author of comedies and operettas in collaboration with authors such as Pierre Veber, Tristan Bernard, Albert Willemetz and especially Yves Mirande.

Life 
In June 1919, he founded, with Jacques Rouché, Alphonse Franck and Paul Gavault, the Société amicale des directeurs de théâtre, of which Albert Carré was appointed honorary president.

He was knighted in the Legion of Honour in 1920 and became an officer in 1925.

Quinson died in Paris on 1 August 1943 at age 75.

Works 
 Le Chasseur de chez Maxim's, comedy in three acts with Yves Mirande, Palais-Royal, 23 December 1920
 Ta bouche, operetta in three acts by Yves Mirande and Gustave Quinson, lyrics by Albert Willemetz, music by Maurice Yvain, Théâtre Daunou, 1 April 1922
 La Merveilleuse Journée, comedy in three acts with Yves Mirande, Palais-Royal, 17 October 1922
 Pourquoi m'as-tu fait ça ?, comedy in three acts by Yves Mirande and Gustave Quinson, Théâtre des Capucines, 22 December 1922
 Là-haut, operetta bouffe in three acts and 4 scenes, music by Maurice Yvain, libretto by Gustave Quinson, Yves Mirande and Albert Willemetz, Théâtre des Bouffes-Parisiens, 31 March 1923
 Embrassez-moi, comedy in three acts with Tristan Bernard and Yves Mirande, Palais-Royal, 23 December 1923
 Miche et son père, comedy with Yves Mirande, Théâtre des Capucines, 11 April 1924
 P. L. aime, musical with Rip and Yves Mirande, music by Henri Christiné, Palais-Royal, 1924
 La Vérité toute nue, comedy in three acts with Pierre Veber, Théâtre de Paris, 1 September 1925
 La Grue du cinquième, comédie-vaudeville with Yves Mirande, Scala, 1927
 Une petite femme dans un lit, comedy with Yves Mirande, Palais-Royal, 1927–28
 La Demoiselle de Mamers, comedy with Yves Mirande, Palais-Royal, 1933
 C'est vous que je veux, comedy with Yves Mirande, Palais-Royal, 1934
 Le Train de 8 heures 47, operetta in three acts and five scenes by Léopold Marchès after Georges Courteline, lyrics by André Barde, music by Charles Cuvillier, Palais-Royal, 22 December 1936 (uncredited)

Directions 
1902-1914: Théâtre de la tour Eiffel
1903-1907: Théâtre Moderne
1906-1909: Théâtre Grévin
1910-1942: Théâtre du Palais-Royal
1912-?: Théâtre du Vaudeville
1913: Théâtre de la Renaissance (interim)
1913-1929: Théâtre des Bouffes-Parisiens
1925-1937: Théâtre de la Michodière
1936: Théâtre Pigalle

References

Bibliography 
 Philippe Chauveau, Les Théâtres parisiens disparus (1402-1986), Ed. de l'Amandier, Paris, 1999

External links 
 Répertoire musical des Bouffes-Parisiens (1918-1940) on L'Encyclopédie multimedia de la comédie musicale théâtrale en France

1868 births
Writers from Marseille
1943 deaths
20th-century French dramatists and playwrights
Officiers of the Légion d'honneur
French theatre directors